is a passenger railway station of the West Japan Railway Company (JR-West) located in the city of Iga, Mie, Japan.

Lines
Shimagahara Station is served by the Kansai Main Line, and is located 101.8 rail kilometres from the terminus of the line at Nagoya Station and 41.9 rail kilometers from Kameyama Station.

Layout
The station consists of two side platforms serving one track each, connected by a footbridge. Automatic ticket vending machines are not installed, as tickets are only issued by POS terminals.

Platforms

History
Shimagahara Station was opened on November 11, 1897, with the extension of the Kansai Railway from Iga-Ueno Station to Kamo Station. The Kansai Railway was nationalized on October 1, 1907, becoming part of the Imperial Government Railways (IGR), which became Japan National Railways (JNR) after World War II. Freight operations were discontinued from August 1, 1970. With the privatization of JNR on April 1, 1987, the station came under the control of JR-West.

Passenger statistics
In fiscal 2019, the station was used by an average of 113 passengers daily (boarding passengers only).

Surrounding area
Shimagahara Post Office
Kizu River

See also
 List of railway stations in Japan

References

External links

  

Railway stations in Japan opened in 1897
Railway stations in Mie Prefecture
Iga, Mie